Governor Houston may refer to:

George S. Houston (1811–1879), 24th Governor of Alabama
Sam Houston (1793–1863), 6th Governor of Tennessee, 7th Governor of Texas
Sir William Houston, 1st Baronet (1766–1842), Acting Governor of Gibraltar from 1831 to 1835

See also
John Houstoun (1744–1796), Governor of Georgia from 1778 to 1779